McGovern Centennial Gardens is a collection of gardens in Hermann Park, in Houston, Texas, United States.

Description and history
"Previewed" in October 2014 and officially opened in December 2014, the  park cost $31 million and took approximately eight years to complete. The park has a  Garden Mount.

Public art
The Hawkins Sculpture Walk features sculptures of notable figures, including busts of Robert Burns (2002), Álvar Núñez Cabeza de Vaca, Ramón Castilla, José Martí, Bernardo O'Higgins (1992), José Rizal (2006), and Vicente Rocafuerte, as well as statues of Simón Bolívar (1977), Benito Juárez, and José de San Martín (1983) McGovern also features Dawn (1971), which was previously installed inside the entrance to the Houston Garden Center, as well as statues of Confucius, Mahatma Gandhi (2004), and Martin Luther King Jr. (2007).

Bust of Bernardo O'Higgins 

Bernardo O'Higgins is an outdoor 1992 bronze sculpture of the Chilean independence leader of the same name by Julian Martinez, the same sculptor also responsible for the nearby statue of Benito Juárez. Previously, the bust was installed at Hermann Park's International Sculpture Garden. It rests on a granite pedestal and was acquired by the City of Houston through FAMAE/Arcomet in 1992.

See also

 Lillie and Hugh Roy Cullen Sculpture Garden, Houston
 List of public art in Houston

References

External links
 

Gardens in Texas
Parks in Houston
Sculpture gardens, trails and parks in the United States